Marmorana platychela is a species of air-breathing land snail, a terrestrial pulmonate gastropod mollusk in the family Helicidae.

Distribution
This species lives in north-western Sicily (Italy). It is confined to limestone rock faces.

Description

References

External links 

Species summary for Marmorana platychela AnimalBase

Helicidae
Endemic fauna of Italy
Gastropods described in 1830